Cheshmeh-ye Ali Mohammad (also Romanized as Cheshmeh-ye ‘Alī Moḩammad and Cheshmeh Ali Mohammad; also known as Chasmeh-ye ‘Alī Moḩammad, Cheshmeh-ye ‘Aī Moḩammad, and Cheshmeh-ye ‘Alishāh) is a village in Kamazan-e Vosta Rural District, Zand District, Malayer County, Hamadan Province, Iran. At the 2006 census, its population was 89, in 25 families.

References 

Populated places in Malayer County